This Is the Way It Goes & Goes & Goes is the debut album by Seattle band Juno, released in 1999 on DeSoto Records.

Track listing

"The Great Salt Lake/Into the Lavender Crevices of Evening the Otters Have Been Pushed" - 5:31	
"Rodeo Programmers" - 2:53	
"The Young Influentials" - 4:00
"All Your Friends Are Comedians"  - 3:27
"Leave a Clean Camp and a Dead Fire" - 9:51	
"January Arms"  - 8:33	
"Venus on 9th Street" - 3:14	
"A Listening Ear" - 7:19	
"Are You Still There?"  - 0:55	
"The Sea Looked Like Lead"  - 8:07

References

1999 debut albums
Juno (band) albums
DeSoto Records albums